Klaus Mack (born 23 April 1973) is a German politician of the Christian Democratic Union (CDU) who has been serving as a member of the Bundestag since the 2021 elections.

Life and politics 
Mack was born 1973 in the West German town of Lonsee. He was elected directly to the Bundestag in 2021, representing the Calw district. In parliament, he has since been serving on the  Committee on the Environment, Nature Conservation, Nuclear Safety and Consumer Protection.

Other activities
 Nuclear Waste Disposal Fund (KENFO), Alternate Member of the Board of Trustees (since 2022)

References 

Living people
1973 births
Christian Democratic Union of Germany politicians
21st-century German politicians
Members of the Bundestag 2021–2025
People from Alb-Donau-Kreis